Cutten may refer to:

People with the surname
 Arthur William Cutten (1870–1936), Canadian-born American businessman
 George Barton Cutten (1874–1962), Canadian-born university administrator
 William Cutten (1822–1883), New Zealand politician

Places
Cutten, California

See also
 Cuthbert (disambiguation)
 Cutting (disambiguation)